Henry Joseph Richter (April 9, 1838 – December 26, 1916) was a German-born prelate of the Roman Catholic Church. He served as the first bishop of the new Diocese of Grand Rapids in Michigan from 1883 until his death in 1916.

Biography

Early life 
Henry Richter was born on April 9, 1838, in Neuenkirchen in the Grand Duchy of Oldenburg (later part of Germany) to Johann and Anna (née Albers) Richter. After studying at local schools and under a private teacher, Henry Richter immigrated to the United States in 1854, settling in Cincinnati, Ohio.  He then enrolled at St. Xavier's College in Cincinnati. Richter then studied at St. Joseph's College in Bardstown, Kentucky, before returning to Cincinnati to attend Mount St. Mary's Seminary. In 1860, he was sent to the Pontifical North American College in Rome, obtaining a Doctor of Sacred Theology degree in 1865.

Priesthood 
While in Rome, he was ordained to the priesthood for the Archdiocese of Cincinnati by Cardinal Costantino Patrizi Naro on June 10, 1865. Upon his return to Cincinnati in October 1865, Richter was named professor of dogmatic theology, philosophy, and liturgy at Mount St. Mary's Seminary. He also served as chaplain to the Sisters of Charity at Cedar Grove, and became vice-president of Mount St. Mary's in 1866. In 1870, he was appointed as the founding pastor of St. Lawrence Parish in the Price Hill neighborhood of Cincinnati.

Bishop of Grand Rapids 
On January 30, 1883, Richter was appointed the first bishop of the newly erected Diocese of Grand Rapids by Pope Leo XIII. He received his episcopal consecration on April 22, 1883, from Archbishop William Elder, with Bishops Caspar Borgess and William McCloskey serving as co-consecrators, at St. Andrew's Cathedral in Grand Rapids 

When Richter was appointed bishop, the diocese had 36 priests, 33 churches, 17 parochial schools, and 50,000 Catholics; by the time of his death, there were 75 priests, 56 churches, 38 parochial schools, and over 150,000 Catholics. He also attended the Second (1882) and Fifth (1889) Provincial Councils of Cincinnati and the Third Plenary Council of Baltimore (1884).

Death and legacy 
Henry Richter died on December 26, 1916, after three days of illness at St. Mary's Hospital in Grand Rapids; he was age 78.

References

1838 births
1916 deaths
German emigrants to the United States
The Athenaeum of Ohio alumni
Roman Catholic Archdiocese of Cincinnati
People from Oldenburg (city)
20th-century Roman Catholic bishops in the United States
St. Xavier High School (Ohio) alumni
American chaplains
Roman Catholic bishops of Grand Rapids
19th-century Roman Catholic bishops in the United States